The 2023 Formula Car Challenge presented by Goodyear is the 19th season of the Formula Car Challenge. It is be a multi-event motor racing championship for single-seater open wheel formula racing cars held across the American west coast. The series is sanctioned by the Sports Car Club of America.

Drivers 
Drivers compete in three classes, Formula Mazda, Formula Speed and Pro Formula Mazda.

Formula Mazda entries

Formula Speed entries

Pro Formula Mazda Entries

Race calendar 
The 2023 schedule was announced on 1 December 2022. All races are held in California. The series will return to Buttonwillow Raceway Park after not competing there in 2022.

Race results 

‡ - event or race did not award any points as it did not meet all FCC rules

Championship standings

Scoring system

Formula Mazda 
Points are awarded to the top twenty drivers in each class taking the green flag.

Pro Formula Mazda and Formula Speed 
As the Formula Speed and Pro Formula Mazda classes run alongside the San Francisco Region SCCA's regional FX and FA3 classes respectively, they use their points system.

Drivers' standings 

‡ - event or race did not award any points as it did not meet all FCC rules

References

External links 

Formula Car Challenge
Formula Car Challenge
Formula Car Challenge